Gunfighter Ballads and Trail Songs is the fifth studio album by Marty Robbins, released on the Columbia Records label in September 1959 and peaking at number 6 on the U.S. pop albums chart. It was recorded in a single eight-hour session on April 7, 1959, and was certified Gold by the RIAA in 1965 and Platinum in 1986. It is perhaps best known for Robbins's most successful single, "El Paso", a major hit on both the country and pop music charts, as well as for its opening track, "Big Iron", a song that gained a resurgence in popularity online as an Internet meme.

Gunfighter Ballads and Trail Songs reached number one on both the country and pop music charts at the start of 1960 and won the Grammy Award for Best Country & Western Recording the following year. A follow-up album of cowboy songs, More Gunfighter Ballads and Trail Songs, was released in 1960. In 2017, Gunfighter Ballads and Trail Songs was selected for preservation in the National Recording Registry by the Library of Congress as being "culturally, historically, or artistically significant".

Reception

AllMusic gave the album four-and-a-half stars, calling it "the single most influential album of Western songs in post-World War II American music". It is included in every revision of the list of 1001 Albums You Must Hear Before You Die.

Years after the album's release, members of the Western Writers of America chose six of its songs as being among the Top 100 Western Songs of all time. Three of them were written by Robbins: "El Paso", "Big Iron", and "The Master's Call". Three were written and previously recorded by others: "Cool Water", "Billy the Kid", and "The Strawberry Roan".

In 1999 the album was reissued for compact disc on the Legacy Records label with the tracks resequenced and with three bonus tracks: the full length version of "El Paso", the B-side "Saddle Tramp" and the film song "The Hanging Tree". It was part of Sony's American Milestones reissue series for classic country and western albums including, among others, At Folsom Prison by Johnny Cash and Red Headed Stranger by Willie Nelson.

In 2010, "Big Iron" was featured in Obsidian Entertainment's role-playing video game Fallout: New Vegas as a track on the in-game radio. The inclusion of the song in the game led to a resurgence in its popularity in the 2010s, with players rediscovering the album and creating Internet memes such as parodies and edits of the album cover and edits/mashups of "Big Iron".

Track listing

Side one

Side two

1999 reissue track listing
The reissue adds the tracks "The Hanging Tree" (a non-album single), "Saddle Tramp" (B-side of "Big Iron"), and a "full-length version" of "El Paso".

Personnel
 Marty Robbins – vocals, guitar
 Grady Martin – lead guitar
 Jack Pruett – rhythm guitar
 Bob Moore – bass
 Louis Dunn – drums
 Tompall & the Glaser Brothers, Bobby Sykes – backing vocals

Charts

References

1959 albums
Marty Robbins albums
Columbia Records albums
Legacy Recordings albums
United States National Recording Registry recordings
United States National Recording Registry albums